{{DISPLAYTITLE:C18H32O3}}
The molecular formula C18H32O3 may refer to:

 Coronaric acid, or isoleukotoxin
 9-Hydroxyoctadecadienoic acid
 13-Hydroxyoctadecadienoic acid (13-HODE)
 Vernolic acid (leukotoxin)